The Fossil Record 1980-1987 is a compilation album by Birdsongs of the Mesozoic, released on 1993 by Cuneiform Records. It comprises unreleased tracks from the band's early years.

Track listing

Release history

References

External links 
 Fossil Record 1980-1987 at Discogs (list of releases)
 The Fossil Record 1980-1987 at Bandcamp

1993 compilation albums
Birdsongs of the Mesozoic albums
Cuneiform Records albums